Poorva Gokhale (born 20 January 1978) is a Marathi TV actress known for her role as Anupriya in Zee TV's Tujhse Hai Raabta.

Personal life
Born as Poorva Gupte and then married to a businessman named Kedar Gokhale, she is the  daughter of a theater actress. She did her schooling from Holy Cross Convent school in Thane, and trained in classical dance. She attended V.G. Vaze college in Mulund. She was a Chartered Accountancy Final level student. She has cleared one of two groups. However her urge for acting led her to this career.

Career
As a teen, Gokhale co-starred in the Hindi serial Kkoi Dil Mein Hai which focused on two very different friends. Gokhale played a quieter and more traditional girl in contrast to Karishma Tana's role of an outgoing flirt.

She later appeared in the Hindi serial Kahaani Ghar Ghar Kii as Gunn Krishna Agarwal. She has also starred in a Hindi Music Album named Boondein. She was the lead actress in a Marathi Television show Kulavadhu

She has acted in the Marathi stage plays Smile Please and "Selfie." She received her first movie role in 2020. It was a Marathi movie named Bhaybheet.

Later, she played as Anupriya Deshmukh in the Zee TV show "Tujhse Hai Raabta".

Currently she is playing as Revati Choudhary in the StarPlus show "Yeh Hai Chahatein".

Television

References

External links
 

1978 births
Indian television actresses
Living people
People from Thane
Marathi actors